Swami Vivekananda Road may refer to the following places in India:

 Swami Vivekanand Road (Mumbai)
 Swami Vivekananda Road metro station, in Bangalore, India